The Mystere incident was an EverQuest controversy revolving around a player named "Mystere", banned from the game by Verant (EverQuests developer) over a controversial role-playing story. Mystere, a male player on the Brell Serilis server who roleplayed and posted both as the female dark elf "Mystere" and, less frequently, a male Iksar character "Vhasst", wrote a fan fiction story which depicted the rape of a dark elf girl of "barely 14 seasons". This story was posted under the name "Vhasst" on July 11, 2000 to third-party Brell Serilis server boards not affiliated with Verant or Sony.

At some point afterwards, an anonymous party contacted Verant complaining about Mystere's story. On October 4, 2000, Mystere was abruptly kicked out of EverQuest, and the story was soon after removed from the IGN message board where it was originally posted. Upon contacting Mystere, George Scotto, head of customer service, informed him that he had been banned. According to Mystere:

This incident was discussed in two GameSpot articles under News and Features about the EverQuest: The Ruins of Kunark expansion.  The first, on October 6, 2000, was a mention of the incident and the stir it had caused in the EverQuest gaming community.  The second, on October 10, 2000, being a Q&A with Sony / Verant's John Smedley to get the publisher's perspective on what had occurred.

The incident also led to the removal of a quest in the game which requires the player to murder a pregnant halfling (due to criticism that the quest was as violent as anything in Mystere's story), became the subject of academic papers, and inspired a Penny Arcade cartoon as well as a week-long story arc in the PvP webcomic.

Some years later, on February 16, 2006, John Smedley brought up the incident again on his blog. In his post, he claims that Verant took the heat silently over the debacle because the full story could not be disclosed to the public, and involved allegations of criminal behavior:

References

External links
Taylor, T.L. (2002). Whose game is this anyway? Negotiating corporate ownership in a virtual world. Computer Games and Digital Cultures Conference Proceedings, Ed. Frans Mayra, Tampere University Press (2002), pp. 227-242.
planetcrap.com, "EverQuest player banned over 'child porn' claim", October 5, 2000 (The original story which caused the controversy is reproduced at this link, in post #64 by "IlIIllllI1")
Smart Computing, "Living in a Fantasy World", May 2001, p.196-199

EverQuest
Video game controversies